

Seeds
  Suchanan Viriyaprasert
  Ayu-Fani Damayanti

Draw

Women's Singles